Ahmad Jannati (born 23 February 1927) is an Iranian conservative politician. He was born in Ladan, Isfahan. Jannati is known for his anti-LGBT rhetoric and opposition to secularism. He is also a founding member of the Haghani school of thought. 

Today, Jannati occupies two prominent posts in Iranian politics as chairman of the Assembly of Experts, the body charged with choosing the Supreme Leader, and as chairman of the Guardian Council, the body in charge of checking legislation approved by  Majlis with the Constitution and sharia, and approving the candidates in various elections.

Career
Jannati has been a member of the Guardian Council since 1980 and has been its chair since 1988. In 2016, he became the chairman of the Assembly of Experts, the body in charge of appointing the Supreme Leader. He was reappointed to the earlier post in 2022.

Views
During a Friday Prayer on 4 August 2006, Jannati asserted that "support for Hezbollah" was "a duty." Regarding Iraq, around the time its draft constitution was presented to parliament in 2005, he said: "Fortunately, after years of effort and expectations in Iraq, an Islamic state has come to power and the constitution has been established on the basis of Islamic precepts".

On election protest
In a Friday prayer sermon on 29 January 2010 in Tehran, Jannati "praised Iranian judicial authorities for executing two political dissidents" the day before and "urged officials to continue executing dissidents until opposition protests come to an end."

Jannati sees leniency with the dissidents as un-Islamic. "God ordered the prophet Muhammad to brutally slay hypocrites and ill-intentioned people who stuck to their convictions. Koran insistently orders such deaths. May God not forgive anyone showing leniency toward the corrupt on Earth."

Responding to clerics such as Jannati wanting to speed up executions, Iran's judiciary chief firmly stated his opposition, commenting that it was against the Sharia and Iranian law: "Political assumptions should not influence judicial investigations because we won't have a response before God should an innocent person be punished due to hasty action."

On the United States
In a 1 June 2007 speech aired on Iranian TV Channel 1 (as translated by MEMRI), Jannati stated:
People are increasingly inclined towards the Koran, towards Islam, towards the Islamic Revolution and the Imam [Khomeini]. Just like this movement destroyed the monarchical regime here, it will definitely destroy the arrogant rule of hegemony of America, Israel, and their allies... At the end of the day, we are an anti-American regime. America is our enemy, and we are the enemies of America. The hostility between us is not a personal matter. It is a matter of principle. We are in disagreement over the very principles that underlie our revolution and our Islam.

In April 2008, he stated, "You cried: `Death to the Shah,` and indeed, he died. You cried: `Death to Israel,` and it is now on its deathbed. You cry: `Death to America,` and before long, Allah willing, the prayer for the dead will be recited over it."

On 17 September 2010, Jannati "described the recent desecration of the holy Quran in the United States [as] an insane behavior," apparently referring to the 2010 Qur'an-burning controversy. In the same Friday Prayer, he reportedly claimed that "opinion polls reveal[ed] that 84 percent of the Americans consider the US administration responsible for 9/11 attacks." The Ayatollah's comments about Americans' opinions about 9/11 were cited by analysts after President Ahmadinejad made similar comments, amongst others, the next week at the United Nations. The president's speech sparked at least 33 delegations to walk out from the General Assembly, and ensuing criticism.

In a sermon in Tehran, which was broadcast on Iran's Channel 1 on 21 February 2014 (as translated by MEMRI), Jannati told a crowd that "If we, the people, are against America, you [Iranian leaders] must oppose it too" and that "Death to America" was "the first option on our table...This is the slogan of our entire people without exception. This is our number one slogan."

On hijab
Jannati takes a strong stand in favor of compulsory hijab, or covering for women. In June 2010, he spoke out against Iranian President Ahmadinejad for his alleged laxness on compulsory hijab in Iran. After Ahmadinejad proposed a "cultural campaign" to combat loose hijab rather than a police crackdown, Jannati responded, "Drug traffickers are hanged, terrorists are executed and robbers are punished for their crimes, but when it comes to the law of God, which is above human rights," some individuals "stay put and speak about cultural programs."

Public image
According to a poll conducted in March 2016 by Information and Public Opinion Solutions LLC (iPOS) among Iranian citizens, Jannati has 21% approval and 31% disapproval ratings and thus a –10% net popularity while 36% of Iranian people don't recognize the name. Jannati has become a target of ageist stereotyping jokes in Iran.

Sanctions
In February 2020, the U.S. Treasury Department sanctioned Jannati for "preventing free and fair elections in Iran."

Personal life
Jannati's wife was Sediqeh Mazaheri with whom he had four sons. She died in 2015, and he later remarried. His son Hossein Jannati was a member of People's Mujahedin of Iran and was killed in a street battle by the Islamic Republic security forces in 1981. He is also father of Ali Jannati, who served as Minister of Culture.

See also 

 List of Ayatollahs
 Khamenei
 Ahmad Khatami
 Emami-Kashani
 Aboutorabi Fard
 Movahedi-Kermani
 Haj Ali Akbari
 Friday prayer
List of members in the First Term of the Council of Experts

References

External links

 Membership history
 There is no hope for a free election
Jannati and Karroubi debate on the policy for the evaluation of candidates (BBC Persian)
The Gates of the U.N. and the Security Council Should Be Closed
The English Are the Father of the Great Satan Excerpts from a Friday sermon at Tehran University, Feb. 2005
To the U.S: Invade Iran, If You Dare Feb. 2007 transcript

1927 births
Iranian anti-same-sex-marriage activists
Iranian Islamists
Living people
Society of Seminary Teachers of Qom members
Combatant Clergy Association politicians
Iranian individuals subject to the U.S. Department of the Treasury sanctions
Islamic Republican Party politicians
Members of the Expediency Discernment Council
Members of the Guardian Council
Speakers of the Assembly of Experts
Iranian ayatollahs
Politicians from Isfahan
Shia clerics from Isfahan
20th-century Iranian politicians